The Fowkes hypothesis (after F. M. Fowkes) is a first order approximation for surface energy. It states the surface energy is the sum of each component's forces:
 
γ=γd+γp+γi+...
where γd is the dispersion component, γp is the polar, γi is the dipole and so on.

The Fowkes hypothesis goes further making the approximation that the interface between an apolar liquid and apolar solid where there are only dispersive interactions acting across the interface can be estimated using the geometric mean of the contributions from each surface i.e.

γSL=γS+γL-2(γSp x γLp)1/2

References 
 
 A. V. Pocius, Adhesion and adhesives: an introduction, 2002

Related articles 
 Sessile drop technique: The Fowkes Theory

Surface science